X of Swords is a comic book crossover event which debuted in September 2020, being published by Marvel Comics. It is the next crossover event featured in the "Dawn of X" relaunch after the House of X and Powers of X event. X of Swords was followed by the Hellfire Gala event.

Plot
Lead-up
It is revealed that human ally Moira MacTaggert is actually a reality-warping mutant whose power is to live many "lives". In her ninth life, she allied with Apocalypse and they both rescued the First Horsemen.

Cypher and X travel to the mutant island of Krakoa to establish the future foundation of their mutant paradise. Communicating with Krakoa, Cypher reveals its secret history.

X and Magneto invite all former mutant villains to live on the island including immortal Egyptian mutant Apocalypse (En Sabah Nur). Both Krakoa and Apocalyse interact subtly - a hint of their shared past.

As part of the "Fresh Start" relaunch, an extra-sized issue in celebration of the long history of Marvel Comics includes a one-page story shows Apocalypse reminiscing about his original Four Horsemen who were lost so long ago.

As part of the "Dawn of X" relaunch, Cyclops, Rachel Summers and young Cable travel to a mysterious island on the ocean, where they meet enigmatic character Summoner. It is then revealed that the island is a fragment of Krakoa, with which the living island reunited with at the end of the issue. Weeks later, Summoner recounts the story about the separation of Krakoa and Arakko, while battling the demonic forces of Amenth.

In the new Excalibur title of Dawn of X, it is shown that Apocalypse wants to tap into the magical spring source that is Otherworld ruled by Omniversal Majestrix Saturnyne. This new approximation of Krakoa's mutants and the inhabitants of Otherworld sets the stage for a future confrontation. Some time later, Apocalypse gathers his fellow X-Ternals, and sacrifices some of them to create a portal to connect Krakoa to the Otherworld and Amenth.

Main story
The invading army
It is discovered that the first incarnation of the Horsemen are actually the biological children of Apocalypse and his wife Genesis who was also sent with Arakko. Following that, Apocalypse went to the Summoner and directed him to the portal to Otherworld where he could return to Arakko, while being accompanied by Unus and Banshee. However, what Apocalypse didn't expect was that this was all an elaborated plan created by his own children so they could return and overthrow Krakoa with their fellow Arakki mutants and Daemon army. Apocalypse himself was soon attacked and critically injured by his daughter War, being forced to retreat back to Krakoa to heal their wounds and prepare for war between the two groups.

Failure of the Resurrection Protocols
Former student Rockslide suffers a surprise attack by Summoner, who dilacerates his psychic essence. Hurrying back to Krakoa, the Five proceed to restore his physical husk, but, when X begins to telepathically download his memories, the five Cerebro mainframes fry and short circuit. Apprehensive, the Five convene with the Quiet Council to inform them that once a mutant is killed in Otherworld, this creates problems for the resurrection process.X-Factor (Vol. 5) #4. Marvel Comics.

The gathering of swords
Polaris (Lorna Dane) acts as a medium and delivers the list of swords and cryptic hints about the chosen champions of Krakoa. Magik is the first one to rise to the occasion.

Wolverine and Arakki mutant Solem are sent to a Hell-like dimension to reach legendary bladesmith Muramasa, and ask him to forge new blades for the tournament. Solem gets both of the new Muramasa swords, but yields one to Logan on a yet unrevealed price.

Storm travels to Wakanda to request permission to borrow an ancient relic from the Royal Family: a mystical sword named Skybreaker, made of vibranium and previously wielded by a legendary Wakandan king. Due to the Royal Family's refusal, Ororo is forced to steal it only to face her ex-husband T'Challa, before leaving the country.

In Krakoa, Cypher (Doug Ramsey) shares his worries with Warlock and the Living Island, while training under Magik for the upcoming tournament. Meanwhile, the Quiet Council decides to take a different approach instead of sending a mutant with little battle experience: they agree to send Mister Sinister and his Hellions on a secret mission to sabotage the contest.

Young Cable, Jean Grey and Cyclops travel to the S.W.O.R.D space station and Cable activates it with his sword "Light of Galador". The trio soon discovers that an extradimensional army known as the Vescora massacred the station's occupants. After dealing with this threat, young Cable joins the other swordbearers.

In Otherworld, siblings Betsy Braddock (the new Captain Britain) and Brian Braddock trick regent Saturnyne into forging the Starlight Sword, while also getting the Sword of Might.

Still reeling from the betrayal of his sons, Apocalyse reminisces about the time he lost his wife Genesis and children, the First Horsemen, when Okkara was split into two islands. Soon after, he asks Gorgon to accompany him to Egypt in order to retrieve his own sword (a khopesh) for the upcoming tournament.

In Arakko, the First Horsemen begin to assemble its forces for the upcoming tournament, all the while revealing underlying tensions among themselves and between a few of the major players of Krakoa's side.

Accommodation in Otherworld
After the chosen Swordbearers of Arakko and Krakoa travel to the Otherworld, they are welcomed by Saturnyne. Both parties intermingle and try to discover each other's secrets and weaknesses before the main event: Apocalypse encounters his former wife Genesis who reveals the story of her banishment while Storm shares a dance with the Horseman of Death.Marauders #14. Marvel Comics.

The tournament begins
After the feast, Saturnyne announces the match-ups: Elizabeth Braddock vs. Isca the Unbeaten, Cypher vs. Bei the Blood Moon, Wolverine vs. Summoner.Wolverine #7. Marvel Comics. Aside from one-on-one battles, Saturnyne forces the Swordbearers to compete in a series of extravagant contests.

Magik defeats Pogg Ur-Pogg; Isca wins against Elizabeth Braddock whose body turns to glass and shatters. Wolverine kills Summoner. In a three-way battle with Solem and the Horseman of War (Summoner's mother), Wolverine severs War's hand. Cypher marries Bei the Blood Moon. Storm defeats the Horseman of Death. Gorgon perishes after a fierce battle against White Sword and his troops. Finally, when the score is tied between Krakoa and Arakko, Saturnyne announces the last match: Apocalyse versus his wife Genesis possessed by the Annihilation Mask of Amenth.

In the meantime, Sinister and the Hellions arrive at Otherworld, but their mission goes awry as they have to fight the Otherworldian race of the Locus Vile. Theirs is a bloody battle, and Wild Child perishes by the hand of one of the Locus Vile. The other Hellions barely escape through a portal to Krakoa, but as soon as they return, Sinister betrays the team and slays the survivors.

All-out war
Before his fight with an Arakki champion, young Cable telepathically communicated with Jean Grey and Cyclops on Krakoa. Saturnyne notices the interference and cuts their contact. Fearing for Cable's life, the heroes present their case to the Quiet Council: they intend to take as many mutants to the Otherworld and rescue Krakoa's champions. They also feel the need to reinstate the X-Men as a permanent team to defend their interests.

Cable uses S.W.O.R.D.'s space station to transport everyone they can gather to Otherworld's battlefield (including a reborn Captain Britain Corps), in the middle of an all-out war between Amenth's and Arakko's armies. During the battle, omega-level mutant and unbeatable warrior Isca the Unbeaten suddenly switched sides by changing her color, after Apocalypse managed to take the mask of Amenth from Genesis.

Apocalypse takes Annihilation's mask from his wife's face and wears it. He yields and Amenth's forces surrender. Saturnyne, satisfied with this conclusion, asks both Krakoa and Arakko to trade prisoners, as a token of goodwill: Apocalypse chooses to accompany his wife and children back to Amenth, in exchange for Arakko (and consequently all its mutant inhabitants) returning to Earth, so Krakoa can reunite with its "twin" at last.

Saturnyne is crowned Queen in Otherworld and gets what she needed, but not what she wanted'': Brian Braddock (former Captain Britain)'s heart.

Aftermath

The conclusion of X of Swords saw the X-Men comics line transition from the Dawn of X era to the Reign of X era, which involved the launch of new titles and Vita Ayala taking over writing duties on New Mutants.

In the newly launched S.W.O.R.D. by Al Ewing, the Krakoans take hold of the S.W.O.R.D space station and reposition it as their satellite base, under the command of Agent Abigail Brand.

In Excalibur, Saturnyne has rebuilt the Captain Britain Corps with alternate reality counterparts of Elizabeth Braddock. The original Betsy, however, remains missing after her battle with Isca the Unbeaten, leaving the Excalibur team on a desperate search to find her.

In X-Men, with Cyclops and Jean Grey having decided to work outside the Quiet Council and take a strike team to rescue the Champions in Otherworld, the pair begin work on forming Krakoa's first official X-Men team.

With Apocalypse leaving Krakoa to be with his wife and children in Amenth, and Jean Grey stepping down from her leadership position to form the X-Men, the Quiet Council now has two empty seats. The remaining members now try to pick names to fill the void.

Characters involved

Issues involved

Prelude issues

Main issues

Other

Notes

References

External links
 

2020 in comics
X-Men storylines